The Bigger Lights was an American rock band based in Vienna, Virginia. The band signed with Doghouse Records less than one year after forming. Fiction Fever was released on October 7, 2008. Their self-titled debut album was released on March 30, 2010. The Bigger Lights announced on Twitter and Facebook on July 5 that they will be releasing their second full-length album, Battle Hymn, on July 12.

History
"The band started with JK and Dan. They were in another band for five years together and they weren't happy with the way that it was going and they searched for a singer for about seven or eight months and then they ended up seeing me (Topher) at a show and stealing me from my band that I had just started and that's how I got started with them. We went through a couple people as far as drummers and  guitarists and stuff and then we ended up, one of our good friends, Aaron Stern who played for a band called matchbook romance actually hooked us up with the guy that's our permanent drummer now, his name's Ryan Seaman and he actually used to drum for a band called I Am Ghost and he did stuff with Jeffree Star, which is silly and awesome I guess but now he's with us full time and we did another tour with this band called Tyler Read it was the Atticus Clothing Tour and we actually meshed really well with this one guitarist named Chris who played for Tyler Read and we thought he was the best guitar player we'd ever seen live and we had the opportunity to bring out a second guitarist. We wanted him hands down. He was at the top of the list so that's how that got set up and we love everyone and we're very very happy with the people we have." -Topher Talley

As of March 2011, The Bigger Lights were listed on Doghouse Records website as Alumni. They released their second album, Battle Hymn, in July 2011.

But in of May 2011 Ryan Seaman left the band. He now is part of the band I Don't Know How But They Found Me.

Band members
Christopher "Topher" Talley - lead vocals (2007–2011)
John Kendall "JK" Royston – rhythm guitar (2007–2011)
Dan Mineart – bass guitar (2007–2011)
Chris McPeters – lead guitar (2009–2011)
Mikey Davis – drums, percussion (2007–2009)
John Paul Holt – lead guitar (2007–2008)
Ryan Seaman – drums, percussion (2009–2011)

Discography
 Third Act Stories EP (2007) - Independent - Produced/Mixed by John Kendall Royston & Daniel Mineart
 Fiction Fever EP (2009) - Doghouse Records - Produced/Mixed by Kenneth Mount & Zack Odom
 The Bigger Lights (2010) - Doghouse Records - Produced by Paul Barber & Mixed by Jeff Juliano
 Battle Hymn (2011) - Independent - Produced/Mixed by John Kendall Royston & Daniel Mineart

Tours
This is a list of tours that The Bigger lights have participated on, or will be participating on; individual concerts are not included.

References

External links
 The Bigger Lights on purevolume

American power pop groups
Musical groups established in 2007
Doghouse Records artists